The CAMS 54 was a strengthened and more powerful version of the French CAMS 51 civil transport and naval reconnaissance flying boat, developed for transatlantic flights. It is sometimes referred to as the 54 GR (Grand Raid or very long range flight).

Design and development

The last CAMS 51 prototype, the naval reconnaissance CAMS 51 GR, had set a world weight-to-height record in August 1927 and demonstrated that it could take-off with one engine whilst carrying a load equal to that of the fuel required for a transatlantic crossing.

The CAMS 54 was a single-bay biplane with equal span, rectangular plan wings mounted without stagger. The upper wing was in three parts, a short centre section and two long outer panels; the lower wing had two inner panels, mounted on the upper fuselage and strengthened by short, parallel pairs of struts to mid-fuselage, and two outer panels. Only the lower wing had dihedral. Both upper and lower wings carried narrow-chord ailerons, linked externally by wires, out to their tips. Both were wooden structures based on pairs of spruce box spars and fabric covered, braced together with parallel pairs of interplane struts to the spars.

The flying boat was powered by a pair of engines in push-pull configuration, mounted above the fuselage and just below the upper wing on two inward-leaning pairs of tubular N-struts, with further transverse cross-bracing. Their mounting also supported the wing centre-section with parallel pairs of struts outwards to the spars. Two types of engine could be used, either  Hispano-Suiza 12Mbr V12 enclosed in a common streamlined cowling and cooled with tubular radiators on the wing undersides on either side of the engines or  Gnome-Rhône 9Akx Jupiter nine-cylinder radials, mounted uncowled for cooling, with a circular section cowling between them. Both were geared-down. The forward propeller was well ahead of the wing leading edge but the rear turned in a shallow cut-out in the upper trailing edge. These engines were much more powerful than the  Gnome et Rhône 9Aas of the CAMS 51 and to accommodate them and their propellers on new mountings required the inter-plane gap to be increased.

Structurally the hull was identical with that of the CAMS 51, with longerons and transverse oak frames. It was covered with double teak and plywood planking below the waterline and ply elsewhere.  At the nose the underside had a sharp V-section but this softened aft into a double curvature section; there were two steps, the forward one below the rear of the wing.  Stability on the water was provided by a pair of unstepped floats, strut-mounted below the interplane struts.  Internally the hull was divided into five compartments by reinforced bulkheads, the first forming a hold. The next contained the pilots' enclosed cabin, which was well forward and ahead of the leading propeller, with side-by-side seats, multiple front and side windows and access panels over the seats. Behind the pilots, the radio operator's and navigator's positions were on opposite sides of the aircraft. The fourth compartment housed eight  fuel tanks, with a central corridor between them providing access to the final compartment which held a toilet on one side and a bunk on the other. Behind the last bulkhead was a long, empty hold which reached back to the tail and was easily accessed though an upper, port-side hatch.

The CAMS 54 had a tall, straight-edged fin and balanced rudder. Its rectangular plan, wire braced tailplane was mounted about halfway up the fin.  Its constant chord, balanced elevators were also essentially rectangular, separated by a cut-out for rudder movement. All the rear surfaces were fabric covered; the fixed parts were wood-framed and the control surfaces metal.

Operational history

The CAMS 54's first flights were made in late March 1928, powered with the Hispano-Suiza engines. By 12 May 1928 it was making long test flights with the Gnome et Rhône radials, flown by Lt. Paris.

The east-west South Atlantic crossing was begun in July 1928, a year which saw many such attempts. On 22 July the CAMS 54, with the radial engines, named La Frégate and crewed by Paris, second pilot and wireless operator Cadou and  flight engineer Marot, flew to Horta, Azores. Inspection of the engine after landing showed it could not be repaired and also that the heavy loads sustained by the forward engine operating alone had caused serious wear, ruling out further long flights. The French Marine Ministry therefore decided to bring La Frégate back to the mainland by boat.

In February 1929 La Frégate was being prepared for another flight over the South Atlantic, equipped with  V-12 Hispano engines.

Specifications (HS engine)

References

External links
Aviafrance CAMS 54

Flying boats
Twin-engined push-pull aircraft
CAMS aircraft
Biplanes
Aircraft first flown in 1928